Loki Crichton (born 14 March 1976) is a former Samoan rugby union international player. He played at fullback or fly-half.

Club career
As a schoolboy he attended Auckland's Kelston Boys High School on a scholarship from Samoa, playing for their 1st XV, then moving to Counties Manukau where he played for Manurewa Rugby Club from 1995 to 2001. He also made 48 appearances for the Counties Manukau Steelers playing at fly-half and fullback alongside Jonah Lomu and Joeli Vidiri.

He transferred to Waikato in 2002. He played for the Chiefs in the Super 14 and Waikato in the Air New Zealand Cup. He made his debut for the Chiefs in 2000 in a match against the Crusaders. In 2005 he suffered  serious neck injury which almost ended his career.

Having travelled north with the Pacific Islanders Loki joined Newcastle on a short-term deal to cover the ongoing problems with Jonny Wilkinson and the England call up for Toby Flood for the 2007 Six Nations Championship.

In 2007 he signed for the Worcester Warriors on a two-year deal that kept him at Sixways until 2009. He was released after the 2008-09 Guinness Premiership. He now plays for L'Aquila in the Top12.

International career
He has represented Samoa on a number of occasions.

Loki Crichton was originally selected to play for Samoa at the 2003 Rugby World Cup however the Waikato Rugby Union refused to release him. He instead made his debut for Samoa in 2006, during the inaugural 2006 IRB Pacific 5 Nations, the same year his contract with Waikato had finished. That year he was also named in the Pacific Islanders touring squad for 2006. But later withdrew.

Loki Crichton was selected in Samoa's Rugby World Cup squad in 2007 and scoring 27 points with a 100% penalty kick success rate and got the man of the match award in the 44–22 loss to England.

References

External links
 Worcester Warriors Profile at Warriors.co.uk
 Manu Samoa supporters website

1976 births
Living people
Rugby union fly-halves
Rugby union fullbacks
Samoan rugby union players
Newcastle Falcons players
Worcester Warriors players
Chiefs (rugby union) players
People from Tuamasaga
Samoa international rugby union players
Pacific Islanders rugby union players
Samoan expatriate rugby union players
Expatriate rugby union players in New Zealand
Expatriate rugby union players in Italy
Expatriate rugby union players in England
Samoan expatriate sportspeople in England
Samoan expatriate sportspeople in New Zealand
Samoan expatriate sportspeople in Italy